Niakaramandougou (often referred to as Niakara) is a town in north-central Ivory Coast. It is a sub-prefecture of and the seat of Niakaramandougou Department in Hambol Region, Vallée du Bandama District. Niakaramandougou is also a commune.

In 2021, the population of the sub-prefecture of Niakaramandougou was 78,301.

Villages
The 15 villages of the sub-prefecture of Niakara and their population in 2014

Notes

Sub-prefectures of Hambol
Communes of Hambol